"Sucks" is a KMFDM single released in anticipation of their 1993 album Angst. It contains four versions of the song "Sucks" as well as "More 'N' Faster", a reworked version of "More & Faster".

The song includes the lyric "We don't like Michael Jackson, we hate Depeche Mode, we don't care for Madonna or Kylie Minogue", a tongue-in-cheek reference to the various (false) interpretations of the initialism "KMFDM" at the time, including "Kill Mother-Fucking Depeche Mode", "Kidnap Madonna For Drug Money" and "Kylie Minogue Fans Don't Masturbate".

Track listing

1992 release

2009 7" reissue

References

1993 singles
KMFDM songs
1993 songs
Wax Trax! Records singles
Songs written by Sascha Konietzko
Songs written by Günter Schulz
List songs